The Den and the Glen (formerly known as Storybook Glen) is a children's park in Maryculter, Scotland, opened in 1984, near the city of Aberdeen. It is best known for its disformed and off-looking models of various fairytale characters, as well as some more modern characters such as Shrek and Postman Pat. The most well known statue is of Barney The Dinosaur, which became an internet meme through an image with the caption "cha cha real smooth". It has been rated a 4-star visitor attraction by the Scottish Tourist Board.

References

External links
Official Website
Visit Britain
Aberdeen Treasures
Visit Scotland

Amusement parks in Scotland
Tourist attractions in Aberdeenshire